In mathematics, a Segal space is a simplicial space satisfying some pullback conditions, making it look like a homotopical version of a category. More precisely, a simplicial set, considered as a simplicial discrete space, satisfies the Segal conditions iff it is the nerve of a category. The condition for Segal spaces is a homotopical version of this. 

References

External links

Category theory
Simplicial sets